Geodia macandrewii is a species of sponge in the family Geodiidae. It is found in the waters of the North Atlantic Ocean. The species was first described by James Scott Bowerbank in 1858.

Bibliography 
 Bowerbank, J.S. (1858). On the Anatomy and Physiology of the Spongiadae. Part I. On the Spicula. Philosophical Transactions of the Royal Society. 148(2): 279-332, pls XXII-XXVI

References

Tetractinellida
Animals described in 1858